is Japanese rock band Radwimps' sixth album, released on March 9, 2011.

Background and development 

After the band's 2009 tour for their previous album, Altcolony no Teiri, the band did not perform or do any band activities for six months, with Noda in this time going to the studio alone and recording demo tapes. After the release of Altocolony no Teiri, Noda felt too cautious in writing lyrics, due to the perfection he had striven for in Altocolony no Teiri. In Summer 2010, the album had begun to take shape, with most of the songs in a completed state. Noda felt that the album was free from many of the constraints in the band's previous work, and that it was a high-energy album. He experimented with  hip-hop in "G-kōi" and jazz-style piano in "Pi".

All of the songs on the album are sung entirely in Japanese, except for a brief English phrase in "G-kōi." This is very different from the band's past albums, which generally feature a few entirely English language songs, and many with large sections sung in English.

Promotion and release 

On June 30, 2010, Radwimps released two singles simultaneously, "Manifesto" and "Keitai Denwa," which reached number two and three on Oricon's single charts, respectively, underneath "Wonderful World!!" by boyband Kanjani Eight. "Manifesto" did not appear on the album, and "Keitai Denwa" appeared as a re-arranged version.

Before the release of the album, the singles "Dada" and "Kyōshinshō" were released in January and February 2011. "Dada" reached number one on Oricon's single charts, becoming Radwimps second single to do so since their debut.

"Kimi to Hitsuji to Ao" was chosen as broadcaster NHK's theme song for soccer events in 2011, including the 2011 J. League Division 1, the first round of the 2012 AFC Men's Pre-Olympic Tournament in June and the 2011 Copa América in July. This is the band's first commercial tie-up since "EDP (Tonde Hi ni Iru Natsu no Kimi)"'s use as the music countdown show Count Down TV's opening theme song in early 2006. A music video, directed by Daisuke Shimada and Sōjirō Kamatani, was filmed for the song. The song was given radio play from February 23, as well as released as a ringtone. Also released as ringtones on the same day were "Daidarabocchi, ""Gakugeikai," and "Tōmei Ningen Jūhachi-gō."

Radwimps took part in Tower Records' No Music, No Life? advertisement campaign from March 8 until March 21, and were featured on in-store posters in Tower Records stores across Japan. The band will also make two appearances on Tokyo FM's School of Lock! on their regular program Rad Locks!, airing in April and May 2011.

The band will tour across Japan between April and July 2011, on their , performing 37 dates.

Track listing

Personnel

Personnel details were sourced from Zettai Zetsumeis liner notes booklet.Performance creditsKei Kawano – piano (#8)
Akira Kuwahara – guitar
Yojiro Noda – vocals, guitar

Neko Saitō – violin (#12)
Yusuke Takeda – bass
Satoshi Yamaguchi – drumsTechnical and production'

Ayaka Doki – assistant engineer
Takashi "Koti" Kotani – equipment and sound coordinator
Kiyoshi Kusaka – recording and mixing engineer
Ken'ichi Nakamura – recording and mixing engineer
Tetsuya Nagato – art direction & graphic design

Tetsuro Sawamoto – assistant engineer
Tohru Takayama – recording and mixing engineer
Hiromichi "Tucky" Takiguchi – parasight mastering
Yoichi Miyazaki – assistant engineer

Chart rankings

Sales and certifications

Release history

References

2011 albums
Japanese-language albums
Radwimps albums